Saint-Cyprien-de-Napierville is a municipality in Les Jardins-de-Napierville Regional County Municipality in Quebec, Canada, situated in the Montérégie administrative region. The population as of the Canada 2021 Census was 1,735. It completely encircles the village of Napierville.

Demographics

Population

Language

Notables places

 Fromagerie le Métayer (Cheesemaker)
 Douglass Cemetery
 Nathaniel Douglass House

See also
List of municipalities in Quebec

References

External links
Saint-Cyprien-de-Napierville official website

Incorporated places in Les Jardins-de-Napierville Regional County Municipality
Municipalities in Quebec